Gérard Faier, known as Gérard Majax (April 28, 1943) is a French illusionist.

He has appeared in many television programs, magic demonstrations, and movies.

From 1987 until 2002 he, along with Jacques Théodor and Henri Broch of the Laboratoire de Zététique at the University of Nice Sophia-Antipolis, oversaw the International Zetetic Challenge.

During the 1990s, on a late night television show by Thierry Ardisson Majax gave a demo of the "rotating table" supernatural phenomenon: a group of "randomly" selected people from the audience stood around a round table, put their hands on it, and the table went up and started rotating. Observation of a video recording made of this event showed that some participants had metal hacks hidden in the sleeves of their jackets. When the participants put the hands on the table, the hacks "pinched" the table underneath, allowing it to be lifted.

In 2000, he created a new theme park attraction called The Hallucinoscope.

See also
 James Randi is an American illusionist and skeptic who has also offered a prize for a demonstration of paranormal phenomena.
 La Maison de la Magie Robert-Houdin

External links
  Gérard Majax's official site
  200,000 Euro Challenge site
 Hallucinoscope site

1943 births
Living people
French magicians